Boban Jančevski - Janker (born 30 April 1978, Vienna, Austria) is a Macedonian retired football striker who last played for FK Teteks in the Macedonian Second League.

Club career
Boban grew up in the village of Rogačevo, in the Tetovo multiplicity where he worked his way up in the local academies. The experienced striker is known for his powerful shots, pace, and his ability to score. Jancevski wears the number 9.

Awards
PFC Lokomotiv Plovdiv
Bulgarian A Professional Football Group: 1
Winner: 2003–04
FK Bashkimi Kumanovo
Macedonian Cup: 1
Winner: 2005
FK Rabotnički Skopje
First Macedonian Football League: 1
Winner: 2007–08
Macedonian Cup: 1
Winner: 2007–08
FK Renova Dzepciste
First Macedonian Football League: 1
Winner: 2009–10

References

External links
Macedonian Football

1978 births
Living people
Footballers from Vienna
People from Tetovo Municipality
Association football forwards
Macedonian footballers
FK Teteks players
FK Tikvesh players
PFC Lokomotiv Plovdiv players
FK Bashkimi players
FK Renova players
K.S.C. Lokeren Oost-Vlaanderen players
FK Rabotnički players
FK Vardar players
FK Makedonija Gjorče Petrov players
FK Ljubanci 1974 players
Macedonian First Football League players
Macedonian Second Football League players
First Professional Football League (Bulgaria) players
Belgian Pro League players
Macedonian expatriate footballers
Expatriate footballers in Bulgaria
Macedonian expatriate sportspeople in Bulgaria
Expatriate footballers in Belgium
Macedonian expatriate sportspeople in Belgium